John Buck may refer to:
John Buck (MP) (1566–1648), MP for Droitwich in 1601
John Buck (Taunton MP), MP for Taunton (1741–1745)
John Buck (baseball) (born 1980), American baseball catcher
John Buck (Onondaga politician) (died 1893), Onondaga politician
John E. Buck (born 1946), American sculptor and printmaker
John R. Buck (1835–1917), United States congressman
John Buck (winemaker), New Zealand winemaker
John Lossing Buck (1890–1975), American agricultural economist
John Buck of the Buck baronets

See also
Buck (surname)